Season 1878–79 was the second in which Hibernian competed at a Scottish national level, entering the Scottish Cup for the second time.

Overview 

Hibs reached the fifth round of the Scottish Cup, losing 2–1 to Helensburgh.

The club began using a ground in the Powderhall area of Edinburgh during this season.

Results 

All results are written with Hibs' score first.

Scottish Cup

See also
List of Hibernian F.C. seasons

References

External links 
 Results For Season 1878/1879 in All Competitions, www.ihibs.co.uk

Hibernian F.C. seasons
Hibernian